A listing of releases by Edyta Górniak (also known mononymously as Edyta), a Polish pop singer.

Albums

Studio albums

Live albums

Compilation albums

Singles

As lead artist

As featured artist

Music videos

Notes

References

Discographies of Polish artists
Pop music discographies